Ivan Zanoni Hausen (November 2, 1927 – April 21, 2003) was a Brazilian track and field athlete who competed at the 1948 Summer Olympics in the 100 metres, 200 metres and 4 x 100 metres relay.

Competition record

References
Ivan Hausen's profile at Sports Reference.com

1927 births
2003 deaths
Brazilian male sprinters
Olympic athletes of Brazil
Athletes (track and field) at the 1948 Summer Olympics